= Tama Forest Reserve =

Forest reserve in Sierra Leone

The Tama Forest Reserve is found in Sierra Leone. It was established in 1926. This site is 170 km^{2}.
